Jean Doujat (1609, in Toulouse – 27 October 1688, in Paris) was a French lawyer, juris consultus, professor of canon law at the Collège royal, docteur-régent at the faculté de droit de Paris, preceptor of the Dauphin and historian. His works include histories of the reign of Louis XIV.

He wrote an important Grammaire espagnole abrégée.

References

1609 births
1688 deaths
Writers from Toulouse
17th-century French lawyers
Academic staff of the Collège de France
17th-century French historians
French translators
Latin–French translators
French legal writers
French Hispanists
Grammarians from France
Linguists of Spanish
Members of the Académie Française
French male non-fiction writers
17th-century French translators